Renzo Luigi Ricca (24 January 1960) is an Italian-born applied mathematician (naturalised British citizen), professor of mathematical physics at the University of Milano-Bicocca. His principal research interests are in classical field theory, dynamical systems (classical and quantum vortex dynamics and magnetohydrodynamics in particular) and structural complexity. He is known for his contributions to the field of geometric and topological fluid dynamics and, in particular, for his work on geometric and topological aspects of kinetic and magnetic helicity, and physical knot theory in general.

Education

Ricca was born and educated first in Casale Monferrato, and then in Turin and Cambridge (UK). He attended the Liceo Scientifico Palli before reading engineering and mathematical sciences at the Politecnico di Torino, where he graduated in 1988. By a prestigious doctoral grant offered by the Association for the Promotion of the Scientific and Technological Development of Piedmont (ASSTP, Turin) he entered Trinity College at the University of Cambridge, where he read mathematics. His Ph.D. work was conducted under the guidance of H. Keith Moffatt on the subject of topological fluid dynamics. In 1991 while completing his doctoral studies he was awarded the J.T. Knight's Prize in Mathematics for work on geometric interpretation of soliton conserved quantities, obtaining the Ph.D. in Applied Mathematics for work on geometric and topological aspects of vortex filament dynamics.

Career
In 1992, after visiting the Institute for Theoretical Physics (UC Santa Barbara) and the Institute for Advanced Study (Princeton), 
Ricca returned to Europe joining the faculty of the mathematics department of the University College London, first as a research fellow. and then as a senior research fellow and part-time lecturer. From 1993 to 1995 he also held a joint position as university researcher at the Politecnico di Torino. In 2003 he moved to the Department of Mathematics and Applications of the University of Milano-Bicocca, first as a visiting scholar and then as associate professor of mathematical physics. He held many visiting positions in various institutions worldwide, and from 2016 he is also guest professor of the Beijing University of Technology (BJUT) in China.

Research

Ricca's main research interests lie in ideal fluid dynamics, particularly as regards geometric and topological aspects of vortex flows and magnetic fields forming knots, links and braids. Aspects of potential theory of knotted fields, structural complexity and energy of filament tangles are also at the core of his research.

Geometric aspects of dynamical systems

In the context of classical vortex dynamics Ricca's main contributions concern the geometric interpretation of certain conserved quantities associated with soliton solutions of integrable systems and the first study of three-dimensional effects of torsion on vortex filament dynamics. In ideal magnetohydrodynamics Ricca has demonstrated the effects of inflexional instability of twisted magnetic flux tubes that trigger braid formation in solar coronal loops. 
In more recent years Ricca has been concerned with the role of minimal Seifert surfaces spanning knots and links, providing analytical description of the topological transition of a soap film surface by the emergence of a twisted fold (cusp) singularity. His current work aims to establish connections between isophase minimal surfaces spanning defects in Bose-Einstein condensates and critical energy.

Topological fluid dynamics

In 1992, relying on earlier work by Berger and Field,  Moffatt and Ricca  established a deep connection between topology and classical field theory 
extending the original result by Keith Moffatt on the topological interpretation of hydrodynamical helicity and 
providing a rigorous derivation of the linking number of an isolated flux tube from the helicity of classical fluid mechanics in terms of writhe and twist. He also derived explicit torus knot solutions 
to integrable equations of hydrodynamic type, and he contributed to determine new relations between energy of knotted fields and topological information in terms of  crossing and winding number information.
In collaboration with Xin Liu, Ricca derived the Jones and HOMFLYPT knot polynomial invariants from the helicity of fluid flows, hence extending the initial work on helicity to highly complex networks of filament structures. This work opened up the possibility to quantify natural decay processes in terms of structural topological complexity. For quantum systems Ricca and collaborators demonstrated that a superposed twist phase may produce a Aharonov-Bohm effect thus inducing the formation of new defects in condensates, and provided topological proof of zero helicity for Seifert framed defects.

Dynamical models in high-dimensional manifolds

In the context of high-dimensional manifolds in 1991 Ricca derived the intrinsic equations of motion of a string as a model for the then emerging string theory of high-energy particle physics, proposing a connection between the hierarchy of integrable equations of hydrodynamic type and the general setting of intrinsic kinematics of one-dimensional objects in (2n+1)-dimensional manifolds. Recently he contributed to extend the hydrodynamic description of the Gross-Pitaevskii equation to general Riemannian manifolds, with possible applications to analog models of gravity in cosmological black hole theory

Origin of mathematical concepts

With a comprehensive review work Ricca contributed to uncover original results by Tullio Levi-Civita and his student Luigi Sante Da Rios on asymptotic potential theory of slender tubes with applications to vortex dynamics, thus anticipating by more than 50 years fundamental discoveries later done in soliton theory and fluid mechanics. He also offered  proof of Karl Friedrich Gauss' own possible derivation of the origin of the linking number concept, and the independent derivation done by James Clerk Maxwell.

Research-Related Activities

In the year 2000 he co-organised and directed a 4-month research programme on geometry and topology of fluid flows held at the Newton Institute for Mathematical Sciences (Cambridge, UK), followed in 2001 by a CIME Summer School under the auspices of the Italian Mathematical Union (UMI). In 2011 he organised a 3-month programme on knots and applications held at the Ennio De Giorgi Mathematical Research Centre of the Scuola Normale Superiore in Pisa. In 
2016 he organised an IUTAM Symposium on helicity (hosted by the Istituto Veneto di Scienze, Lettere ed Arti in Venice) that gathered more than 100 scientists from 20 different countries, and in September 2019 he organised and directed at the Beijing University of Technology (BJUT) the first programme in China devoted to topological aspects of knotted fields. He is a founding member of GEOTOP-A, an international web-seminar series that was launched in 2018 to promote applications of geometry and topology in science. He is also a founding member of The Association for Mathematical Research (AMR), a non-profit organisation launched in 2021 to support mathematical research and scholarship through a broad spectrum of services to the mathematical community.

Visiting Positions

 1991 Research Affiliate, Kavli Institute for Theoretical Physics, University of California at Santa Barbara.
 1992 Junior Visitor, Institute for Advanced Study, Princeton.
 1996–2000 Visiting Professor, Department of Mathematics, University of Geneva.
 1997–1998 Senior Scientist, ISIS, EC-Joint Research Centre, Ispra.
 2000 EPSRC Senior Research Fellow, Isaac Newton Institute for Mathematical Sciences, Cambridge.
 2001 JSPS Visiting Fellow, Kyushu University.
 2002–2003 Visiting Professor, École Normale Superieure, Paris.
 2005–2007 Senior Visitor, DAMTP, University of Cambridge.
 2008 Erasmus Visiting Professor, Laboratoire J.A. Dieudonné University of Nice Sophia-Antipolis.
 2019 Erasmus Visiting Professor, Department of Mathematics, University of Crete.
 2016-2022, BJUT Guest Professor, Beijing-Dublin International College, Beijing University of Technology.

Awards and Distinctions

 1991 J. T. Knight's Prize, U. Cambridge (UK).
 2001 Invitation Fellowship, JSPS (Japan).
 2003 Return "Brain Gain" Scholarship ("Incentivazione alla mobilità di studiosi stranieri e italiani residenti all'estero"), MIUR (Italy)
 2007 Lagrange Senior Research Fellowship, Institute for Scientific Interchange (Italy).
 2008 Erasmus Visiting Professorship, Lifelong Learning Programme 2007–2013 (LLP, EC).
 2019 Erasmus Visiting Professorship, Erasmus+ (EC).

Edited Volumes

 Ricca, R.L. (Editor) An Introduction to the Geometry and Topology of Fluid Flows. NATO ASI Series II 47. Kluwer, Dordrecht, The Netherlands (2001). 
 Ricca, R.L. (Editor) Lectures on Topological Fluid Mechanics. Springer-CIME Lecture Notes in Mathematics 1973. Springer-Verlag, Heidelberg, Germany (2009). 
 Adams, C.C., Gordon, C.McA., Jones, V.F.R., Kauffman, L.H., Lambropoulou, S., Millett, K.C., Przytycki, J.H., Ricca, R.L., Sazdanovic, R. (Editors) Knots, Low-Dimensional Topology and Applications. Springer-Nature, Switzerland (2019).

Sources

 Personal website, CV & Publications
 YouTube Channel
 Research Gate
 Google Scholar
 Mathematics Genealogy Project

References

Alumni of Trinity College, Cambridge
21st-century  Italian mathematicians
Mathematical physicists
Complex systems scientists
1960 births
Living people
20th-century  Italian mathematicians